This was the fourth and last edition of the Neox Fan Awards, created in Spain by Atresmedia with the sponsorship of The Coca-Cola Company's Fanta, for teenage audiences to honor the best of the year in television, films, music and sports. The show featured musical performances by Fifth Harmony,  Dvicio, Abraham Mateo and Gemeliers.

Awards

Film

Music

Television

Neox awards

Fanta awards

References

2015 television awards
2015 in Spanish television